Pedinini is a tribe of darkling beetles in the family Tenebrionidae. There are about 19 genera in Pedinini.

In research by Kamiński et al. published in 2021, Pedinini and six other tribes were moved from Tenebrioninae into the newly resurrected subfamily Blaptinae. These tribes contained 281 genera and about 4000 species, about 50% of Tenebrioninae. The new classification was followed by Bouchard et al. the same year.

Genera
These genera belong to the tribe Pedinini:

 Amatodes Dejean, 1834  (tropical Africa)
 Ametrocera Fåhraeus, 1870  (tropical Africa)
 Anaxius Fåhraeus, 1870  (tropical Africa)
 Apsheronellus Bogatchev, 1967  (the Palearctic)
 Aptila Fåhraeus, 1870  (tropical Africa)
 Asidodema Koch, 1958  (tropical Africa)
 Blastarnodes Koch, 1958  (tropical Africa)
 Cabirutus Strand, 1929  (the Palearctic and Indomalaya)
 Colpotinus Fairmaire, 1891  (the Palearctic)
 Diestecopus Solier, 1848  (tropical Africa)
 Drosochrus Erichson, 1843  (the Palearctic and tropical Africa)
 Leichenum Dejean, 1834  (North America, the Palearctic, Indomalaya, Australasia, and Oceania)
 Loensus R. Lucas, 1920  (tropical Africa and Indomalaya)
 Micrantereus Solier, 1848  (the Palearctic and tropical Africa)
 Nicandra Fairmaire, 1888  (tropical Africa)
 Oncopteryx Gebien, 1943  (tropical Africa)
 Pedinus Latreille, 1797  (the Palearctic and Indomalaya)
 Piscicula Robiche, 2004  (tropical Africa)
 Psectes Hesse, 1935  (tropical Africa)

References

Further reading

 
 

Tenebrionoidea